The following list sorts all cities and municipalities in the German state of Baden-Württemberg with a population of more than 25,000. As of December 31, 2017, 74 cities and municipalities fulfill this criterion and are listed here. This list refers only to the population of individual municipalities within their defined limits, which does not include other municipalities or Suburban areas within Urban agglomerations.

List 

The following table lists the 74 cities in Baden-Würtemberg with a population of at least 25,000 on December 31, 2017, as estimated by the Federal Statistical Office of Germany. A city is displayed in bold if it is a state or federal capital.

 The city rank by population as of December 31, 2017, as estimated by the Federal Statistical Office of German
 The city name
 The name of the district (Landkreis) in which the city lies (some cities are districts on their own called urban districts)
 The city population as of December 31, 2017, as estimated by the Federal Statistical Office of Germany
 The city population as of May 9, 2011, as enumerated by the 2011 European Union census
 The city land area as of December 31, 2017
 The city population density as of December 31, 2017 (residents per unit of land area)

External links 
Cities in Baden-Würtemberg by population

References 

Baden-Württemberg-related lists
Baden-Württemberg
Geography of Baden-Württemberg